The A-List: New York is an American reality television series from the LGBT-interest network Logo which ran from October 4, 2010, to October 17, 2011.

History and description
Frequently described as a Real Housewives-style show, the series followed the lives of six gay and bisexual men in New York City. It was originally announced under the title Kept, but the title was changed in pre-production. The series debuted on October 4, 2010.

On January 18, 2011, Logo announced a second season for the series. Season two began airing on July 25, 2011, and consists of 12 one-hour episodes. The entire original cast returned along with one new cast member. The season picked up several months after where the first season left off.

The A-List: New York was canceled in June 2012.

Cast
 Reichen Lehmkuhl: known for winning the 4th season of The Amazing Race with former husband Chip Arndt and for his relationship with singer Lance Bass, Lehmkuhl is a model, author, actor, activist, jewelry designer and former Air Force pilot.
 Rodiney Santiago: a model from Brazil, Santiago is, at the beginning of the series, Lehmkuhl's boyfriend. Santiago is bisexual and his relationship with Lehmkuhl is his second with a man.
 Mike Ruiz: Ruiz is a film director and fashion photographer whose work has appeared in Interview and Vanity Fair. He had previously appeared on other reality series including America's Next Top Model and RuPaul's Drag Race.
 Austin Armacost: a model, Armacost dated designer Marc Jacobs for a short time.
 Derek Lloyd Saathoff: a former model turned casting agent.
 Ryan Nickulas: hair stylist and owner of Ryan Darius salon.

Critical reception
Reviews for The A-List: New York were mixed. The New York Daily News found that the cast could be "tiresome" but held out hope for some quality drama. The A.V. Club was sharply critical, calling the cast "vapid and materialistic" and characterizing the series as being "about stupid people doing stupid things". Entertainment Weekly and Salon.com touched upon the possible cultural significance of the series. EW reflected on the outrage that some in the LGBT community have expressed about the image of gay men the series projects, answering that criticism by noting that other reality series including The Real Housewives franchise are not viewed with the expectation that its participants are representative of the class as a whole. Salon, while suggesting that the series is a source of "constant indignation" to viewers, nonetheless finds The A-List: New York to be "riveting" television and "a surprisingly thought-provoking reminder of how much representations of gay men on TV have changed and how gay identity is turning into a kind of consumer bracket rather than an act of self-expression".

Episodes

Series overview

Season 1 (2010)

Season 2 (2011)

DVD release

References

External links

2010s American reality television series
2010 American television series debuts
2011 American television series endings
Logo TV original programming
2010s LGBT-related reality television series
2010s American LGBT-related television series
American LGBT-related reality television series
LGBT culture in New York City